James Thomas Woods, Jr. (born June 10, 1943) is a retired American professional basketball player. He played for the Kentucky Colonels during the 1967–68 ABA season after a collegiate career at East Tennessee State University (ETSU). He also played internationally for a time after his one season in the ABA.

Woods was a racial integration pioneer in college. When he enrolled at ETSU as a freshman in 1963–64 to play basketball, he became the first African-American player in school history. In a segregated southern United States, Woods was harshly booed early in his college career. His final three seasons from 1964 to 1967, in which he was eligible to play for the varsity team, saw Woods have an ETSU Hall of Fame career. He was a two-time All-Ohio Valley Conference Team selection and set still-unbroken school records for rebounds in a game (38), career (1,034) and career per-game average (16.2). By the end of his career, the same fans who had been booing him as a freshman were giving him "loudest and longest" standing ovation on senior night that a local reporter had ever seen.

After college, Woods played in the American Basketball Association for the Kentucky Colonels for one season. After a brief stint playing internationally, he retired due to an injury. Woods then served as a police officer in Louisville, Kentucky for the next 30-plus years. In 1996, ETSU inducted him into their hall of fame. On November 3, 2012, in a ceremony prior to the school's 2012–13 season, the men's basketball locker room was named in his honor.

See also
 List of NCAA Division I men's basketball players with 30 or more rebounds in a game

References

1943 births
Living people
American expatriate basketball people
American men's basketball players
Basketball players from Tennessee
East Tennessee State Buccaneers men's basketball players
Kentucky Colonels players
People from Alcoa, Tennessee
Power forwards (basketball)
Basketball players from Louisville, Kentucky